Mopatop's Shop is a children's television series that which premiered on CITV in the UK on 4 January 1999. 260 ten-minute episodes were made and aired daily. It was a co-production between Jim Henson Television and Carlton Television. After it finished its run in 2005 it was repeated for several years afterwards until 2010.

Production
The show was produced and written by Jocelyn Stevenson, who started working with the Muppets as a lead writer on Fraggle Rock. Stevenson explained, "The aim of Mopatop's Shop is to teach young children to embrace language and communication skills in a form where they can expand the boundaries of their imagination. It promotes goodness and wellbeing."

Plot
The show features a large green dragon-like Muppet named Mopatop (performed by Mak Wilson (series 1 and 2) and William Todd-Jones (series 3 and 4) and his red and yellow platypus-like dog-duck hybrid assistant Puppyduck (performed by Victoria Willing). Together they run Mopatop's Shop, a shop where one can buy anything they could ever think or dream of. They interact with characters including the Mouse family, local deliveryman Lamont the sloth, neighbour Claudia Bird, a rabbit named Odd-Job Gerald.

Broadcast history

United Kingdom
The series premiered on CITV on 4 January 1999.

International
On 9 May 2013, it was shown on YouTube during the 1st season in North America after a 5-year wait.

Episodes

Season 1 (1999–2000)
 Wrong Ringer
 This Way to the Garden
 Flea Power
 Hop for the Shop
 Hiccups
 Ghosts
 Upsy Daisy
 Worries
 Trouble With a Puddle
 Horns
 No Mice for sale
 The Seed
 No Job Too Small
 Moon Dreams
 Hug A Bug
 The Whizzy
 Nowhere For a Square
 Grand Opening
 Shake A Shake
 Mr Grizzle's Laugh
 Nothing
 Teething Trouble
 Simply Sorry
 Monty's Fuzzy Wuzz
 Ants
 Something Special
 Singa Songa
 Hairy Fairy
 Whispers
 Nodding Off
 Flowers
 Home Sweet Home
 Ship Ahoy
 You Are What You Are
 The Do-What-I-Say
 Bright Ideas
 Surprise Party
 Musical Sounds
 Surprises
 The Perfect Tail
 Cock-A-Doodle Bee
 The Happy Flapper
 No Sea
 Easy Peasy
 Thingamajig
 Wind
 The Brave Canary
 The Flying Chicken
 Warm Snow
 The Magic Teeny
 Cold Feet
 A Secret 
 Sniffly Whiffler
 Singalotti
 The Big Bicycle Race
 Swapsies
 Dancin' on the Shop
 Find The Way You Are
 The Fly
 Go Slow
 Fast Run
 Mud
 Fishing
 Teasy Sneezy
 Whistles

Season 2 (2000–2001)
 Where's the Blue Paint?
 Princess Lulabelle
 Light Up My Life
 Meesy Mouse
 Mervyn Muddle
 Whatever Next?
 The Gobbledegook
 Sea Tree House
 Pop Star
 The Wizard's Wand
 Doctor Zuckermonster
 The Neenoo
 Helping Hands
 Tweet! Roar!
 Flying Carpet
 Rosey Nosey
 The Grumblegrouch
 Weirdy Beardy
 Splish! Splish! Splat!
 Magic Cakes!
 Feathers
 Hidey Seekies
 Rude Dude
 Bath Buddy
 I Want To Be a Unicorn
 The Do Wah Be Do
 Hair! Hair! Everywhere!
 Smells
 One Of Those Days
 The Flootle Toot
 Ears
 Ducky Dog
 Robbers In The Shop
 The See Me Not
 Runaway Socks
 The Gobbledegook
A Shopping Trip
 Keys
 Real Cool Shoes
 Nellie the Belly Dancer
 What's In An Egg?
 Rumble! Rumble!
 The Magic Rabbit
 Silly Stephen
 Mouldylocks and the Three Pears
 How Scary Is That?
 Animal Choir
 Bruno Butterfingers
 Thinking Cap
 Hullabaloo
 Little Miss Kissy Kiss
 Puppyduck's Granny
 Flower the Leader
 Backwards Forwards
 Stuck In A Bucket
 Load of Old Rubbish
 Ice Screams!
 Mirror, Mirror
 Mac and The Lollystalk
 The Bigulator
 Mouse Count
 Snores
 Gluey Gloop
 Midip
 Dream the Dream

Season 3 (2001–2002)

Season 4 (2002–2003)

References

External links
 Mopatop's Shop at itv.com/citv
 

1990s American children's comedy television series
2000s American children's comedy television series
1990s American workplace comedy television series
2000s American workplace comedy television series
1999 American television series debuts
2003 American television series endings
1990s British children's television series
2000s British children's television series
1990s British workplace comedy television series
2000s British workplace comedy television series
1999 British television series debuts
2003 British television series endings
American television shows featuring puppetry
British children's comedy television series
British television shows featuring puppetry
English-language television shows
ITV children's television shows
Television series about dragons
Television series by ITV Studios
Television series by The Jim Henson Company
Television series set in shops